Park Ji-ho (born 11 September 1991 in Busan) is a South Korean diver. He competed in the 10 metre platform event at the 2012 Summer Olympics. In 2010, Park won bronze in the synchronized 3 metre springboard event at the Asian Games.

References

South Korean male divers
Divers at the 2012 Summer Olympics
Olympic divers of South Korea
1991 births
Living people
Asian Games medalists in diving
Divers at the 2010 Asian Games
Divers at the 2014 Asian Games
Asian Games bronze medalists for South Korea
Medalists at the 2010 Asian Games
Sportspeople from Busan
21st-century South Korean people